Hot Dog! is an album by the American musician Buck Owens, released in 1988. It was Owens's first studio album since deciding in 1979 to quit the music business. The first single was the title track, which Owens had originally recorded under the name Corky Jones. Owens shot a video for the single.

The album peaked at No. 37 on the Billboard Top Country Albums chart. Owens supported it with a 1989 North American tour.

Production
Partly recorded in Fresno, the album was produced by Jim Shaw. "Under Your Spell Again" is performed as a duet with Dwight Yoakam. Hot Dog! contains covers of "Summertime Blues" and "Memphis". "A-11" is a cover of the Hank Cochran song; "The Key's in the Mailbox" was written by Harlan Howard. "Second Fiddle" is a version of Owens's first charting single.

Critical reception

Robert Christgau admired the "emotion and commitment" of some of the songs. USA Today praised the "group of rejuvenated rockabilly classics like 'Summertime Blues', 'Put a Quarter in the Jukebox' and 'Keys in the Mailbox'." The Houston Chronicle wrote that the album "is not without its charms ... Owens is still in fine voice."

The Advocate concluded that Hot Dog! "sounds a bit tentative, but that might be expected after many years of semi-retirement ... He can still write good songs, and that voice is unmistakable." The Kingston Whig-Standard noted that Owens "attacks each song with zest but at the same time stays within the parameters of traditional country music." The Los Angeles Times stated that Owens's "off-center phrasing always keeps his structurally simple songs of heartbreak and loss musically fresh."

AllMusic wrote that "this isn't one of Owens' best albums by a long shot, but it is a fun session."

Track listing

References

Buck Owens albums
1988 albums
Capitol Records albums